Nevers may refer to:

Places
 Nevers, Nevers, Nièvre, Bourgogne-Franche-Comté, France; a prefecture
 Arrondissement of Nevers, Nièvre, Bourgogne-Franche-Comté, France; a borough (arrondissement)
 Canton of Nevers (disambiguation), Nièvre, Bourgogne-Franche-Comté, France; several cantons
 Roman Catholic Diocese of Nevers, Burgundy, France
 Duchy of Nevers, a duchy of France
 County of Nevers, a county of Burgundy
 Tom Nevers, Nantucket, Massachusetts, USA; a headland on Nantucket island named after the Native American

Facilities and structures
 Tom Nevers Naval Facility, Nantucket, Massachusetts, USA; a U.S. Navy facility
 Nevers Cathedral, Nevers, Nievre, France; a Roman Catholic cathedral
 Nevers station, Nevers, Nievre, France; a train station
 Palais ducal de Nevers (Nevers Palace), Nevers, Nievre, France
 Hôtel de Nevers (disambiguation) (Nevers Hotel)
 Nevers Dam (1889–1955), St. Croix River, Minnesota, USA; a removed dam

People
 Duke of Nevers 
 Duchesses of Nevers, consorts of the Dukes
 Count of Nevers
 Countess of Nevers, consorts to the Counts
 Ernie Nevers (1902–1976), a U.S. American football and baseball player and coach
 Thomas Nevers (born 1956), a U.S. soccer player
 Tom Nevers, Nantucket (born 1640), a Native American from Nantucket whose name is given to the district
 Nevers Mumba (born 1960), a Zambian politician

Fictional characters
 Queen of Nevers, a Marvel Comics fictional character

Other uses
 The Nevers (TV series), a 2021 science fiction period European drama from HBO
 USO Nevers (aka "Nevers"), Nevers, Nievre, France; a French rugby union team
 FC Nevers 58 (aka "Nevers"), Nevers, Nievre, France; a French soccer team

See also

 Tom Nevers (disambiguation)
 
 
 
 Never (disambiguation)